{{DISPLAYTITLE:Δ7-sterol 5(6)-desaturase}}

In enzymology, a Δ7-sterol 5(6)-desaturase is an enzyme that catalyzes the chemical reaction

Δ7-sterol + 2 ferrocytochrome b5 +  + 2 H+ = Δ5,7-sterol + 2 ferricytochrome b5 + 2 

The four substrates of this enzyme are Δ7-sterol, ferrocytochrome b5, H+, and O2. Its three products are Δ5,7-sterol, ferricytochrome b5, and H2O.

Classification 

This enzyme is one of C-5 sterol desaturases, belongs to the family of oxidoreductases, specifically those acting on paired donors, with O2 as oxidant and incorporation or reduction of oxygen. The oxygen incorporated need not be derived from O2. With oxidation of a pair of donors resulting in the reduction of molecular oxygen to two molecules of water.

Nomenclature 

The systematic name of this enzyme class is Δ7-sterol,ferrocytochrome b5:oxygen oxidoreductase 5,6-dehydrogenating. Other names in common use include:
 lathosterol oxidase
 Δ7-sterol Δ5-dehydrogenase
 Δ7-sterol 5-desaturase
 Δ7-sterol-C5(6)-desaturase
 5-DES

Gene names:

 SC5D (vertebrates)
 ERG3 (yeast)

Biological role 

This enzyme participates in biosynthesis of steroids.

History 

The following incorrect reaction was suggested:

5α-cholest-7-en-3β-ol + NAD(P)H + H+ + O2  cholesta-5,7-dien-3β-ol + NAD(P)+ + 2 H2O

The substrates of this enzyme were listed as 5α-cholest-7-en-3β-ol, NAD(P)H, H+, and O2. Its products were listed as cholesta-5,7-dien-3β-ol (provitamin D3), NAD+ or NADP+, and H2O. It's was stated that the enzyme has two cofactors: FAD, and FMN.

See also
Fatty acid desaturase
C-5 sterol desaturase

References

 
 
 
 

EC 1.14.21
NADPH-dependent enzymes
NADH-dependent enzymes
Flavoproteins
Enzymes of unknown structure